Altdorf railway station may refer to:

 Altdorf (b Nürnberg) railway station, on the Nuremberg S-Bahn in the German state of Bavaria
 Altdorf (Uri) railway station, on the Gotthard railway in the Swiss canton of Uri
 Altdorf West (b Nürnberg) railway station, also on the Nuremberg S-Bahn in the German state of Bavaria